is a private junior college in Ashikaga, Tochigi, Japan, established in 1979. The predecessor of the college, a women's school, as established in 1925.

External links
 Official website 

Japanese junior colleges
Educational institutions established in 1979
Private universities and colleges in Japan
Universities and colleges in Tochigi Prefecture
1979 establishments in Japan
Ashikaga, Tochigi